Dress Smart is a franchise of shopping centres in New Zealand that specialises in outlet stores.

Auckland
Dress Smart opened at Onehunga in 1995 with the concept of being New Zealand's first factory outlet shopping centre. Onehunga was chosen as the location for Dress Smart in Auckland as it is centrally located and provides direct access from the city and the airport. Dress Smart initially opened with 20 outlet stores opened on the former premises of the 3 Guys supermarket and some other surrounding retail premises. Soon after Dress Smart opened, shops were operating in temporary premises on the southern side of the Paynes Lane. Due to this, the mall was expanded significantly in work that was completed in 2005. This brought the total number of retailers to 110.

Christchurch

Dress Smart in Christchurch opened in 1998.

Former Branches 
There are number of former branches across the country

Tawa, Wellington (opened 1999), now Outlet City
Te Rapa, Hamilton (opened 2006), now The Base (shopping centre)

See also
List of shopping centres in New Zealand

References

Shopping centres in the Auckland Region
Shopping malls established in 1995
1990s architecture in New Zealand